The following is a list of ski areas in New England by vertical drop. Unless otherwise noted, vertical drop figures are from Verticalfeet.com, vertical for Bolton Valley and Magic Mountain directly from their websites. 

Ski areas and resorts in the United States
 
 
 
 
Sports in New England
New England vertical drop
Ski
Ski
Ski
Ski
Skiing in Maine
Skiing in Vermont
Skiing in New Hampshire
Skiing in Massachusetts